Orin Gould Murfin (April 13, 1876 – October 22, 1956) was an admiral in the United States Navy.

During World War I, he supervised U.S. mine-laying bases in Scotland, for which he was subsequently awarded the Distinguished Service Medal. From 1931–34, Murfin was the Navy's Judge Advocate General.

He also served as Commander-in-Chief, Asiatic Fleet, 1935–36. From there, Murfin became the commandant of the 14th Naval District, where he led the Navy's participation in the search for Amelia Earhart when her plane went missing in 1937.

Born in Scioto County, Ohio, Murfin received his early education in Jackson, Ohio. He then attended the United States Naval Academy, graduating in 1897. Murfin served aboard the battleship  during the Spanish–American War. He retired from active duty in May 1940.

Following his retirement, Murfin served as the President of the Navy Court of Inquiry following the attack on Pearl Harbor. The court's conclusions were regarded as too lenient by Secretary of the Navy James V. Forrestal; see Edward C. Kalbfus.

Murfin and his wife Anna settled in Coronado, California after his retirement. He died on October 22, 1956 at the Naval Hospital, Balboa Park in San Diego and was buried in Fort Rosecrans National Cemetery.

See also

List of United States Navy four-star admirals

References

External links
Photo of Admiral Murfin (center)

1876 births
1956 deaths
People from Scioto County, Ohio
People from Jackson, Ohio
United States Naval Academy alumni
Military personnel from Ohio
United States Navy personnel of the Spanish–American War
United States Navy personnel of World War I
United States Navy admirals
Judge Advocates General of the United States Navy
United States Navy World War II admirals
Attack on Pearl Harbor
Recipients of the Navy Distinguished Service Medal
People from Coronado, California
Burials at Fort Rosecrans National Cemetery